The 2019 Southern Conference men's basketball tournament was the postseason men's basketball tournament for the Southern Conference for the 2018–19 season. All tournament games were played at the U.S. Cellular Center in Asheville, North Carolina, from March 8 through 11, 2019.

20th ranked Wofford defeated UNC Greensboro 70–58 in the championship game to win the tournament, and received the conference's automatic bid to the 2019 NCAA tournament. Wofford's perfect season in the SoCon, (perfect regular season, and winning the conference tournament) was the first since the Stephen Curry led Davidson Wildcats accomplished the feat in the 2007–08 season.

Seeds
All ten teams in the Southern Conference were eligible to compete in the conference tournament. Teams were seeded by record within the conference, with a tiebreaker system to seed teams with identical conference records. The top six teams received first-round byes.

Schedule and results

Bracket

See also
2019 Southern Conference women's basketball tournament

References

Southern Conference men's basketball tournament
Tournament
Southern Conference men's basketball tournament
Southern Conference men's basketball tournament
Basketball competitions in Asheville, North Carolina
College sports tournaments in North Carolina
College basketball in North Carolina